The energy policy of the United Kingdom refers to the United Kingdom's efforts towards reducing energy intensity, reducing energy poverty, and maintaining energy supply reliability. The United Kingdom has had success in this, though energy intensity remains high. There is an ambitious goal to reduce carbon dioxide emissions in future years, but it is unclear whether the programmes in place are sufficient to achieve this objective. Regarding energy self-sufficiency, UK policy does not address this issue, other than to concede historic energy security is currently ceasing to exist (due to the decline of North Sea oil production).  

The United Kingdom historically has a good policy record of encouraging public transport links with cities, despite encountering problems with high speed trains, which have the potential to reduce dramatically domestic and short-haul European flights. The policy does not, however, significantly encourage hybrid vehicle use or ethanol fuel use, options which represent viable short term means to moderate rising transport fuel consumption. Regarding renewable energy, the United Kingdom has goals for wind and tidal energy. The 2007 White Paper on Energy set a target that 20% of the UK's energy must come from renewable sources by 2020.

The current energy policy of the United Kingdom is the responsibility of the Department for Business, Energy and Industrial Strategy (BEIS), after the Department of Energy and Climate Change was merged with the Department for Business, Innovation and Skills in 2016. Energy markets are regulated by the Office of Gas and Electricity Markets (Ofgem).

Areas of focus for energy policy by the UK government have changed since the Electricity Act 1989 and the Gas Act 1986 privatised these utilities. The policy focuses of successive UK governments since the full liberalisation of gas and electricity markets in 1998 and 1999 have included managing energy prices, decarbonisation, the rollout of smart meters, and improving the energy efficiency of the country's building stock.

Overview
The 2007 white paper: "Meeting the Energy Challenge" set out the government's international and domestic energy strategy to address the long term energy challenges faced by the UK, and to deliver four policy goals:
 To put the UK on a path to cut carbon dioxide emissions by some 60% by about 2050, with real progress by 2020;
 To maintain reliable energy supplies;
 To promote competitive markets in the UK and beyond, helping to raise the rate of sustainable economic growth and to improve productivity; and
 To ensure that every home is adequately and affordably heated.

The scope of energy policy includes the production and distribution of electricity, transport fuel usage, and means of heating (significantly Natural Gas).
The policy recognises: "Energy is essential in almost every aspect of our lives and for the success of our economy. We face two long-term energy challenges:
 Tackling climate change by reducing carbon dioxide emissions both within the UK and abroad; and
 Ensuring secure, clean and affordable energy as we become increasingly dependent on imported fuel."

The policy also recognises that the UK will need around 30-35GW of new electricity generation capacity over the next two decades as many current coal and nuclear power stations, built in the 1960s and 1970s, reach the end of their lives and are set to close.

The 2006 Energy Review reintroduced the prospect of new nuclear power stations in the UK.  Following a judicial review requested by Greenpeace, on 15 February 2007 elements of the 2006 Energy Review were ruled 'seriously flawed', and 'not merely inadequate but also misleading'. As a result, plans to build a new generation of nuclear power stations were ruled illegal at that time. (See Nuclear power in the United Kingdom for details).  In response, the government ran "The Future of Nuclear Power" consultation from May to October 2007.  The Government's response to the consultation conclusions, published in January 2008, state "set against the challenges of climate change and security of supply, the evidence in support of new nuclear power stations is compelling."

The January 2008 Energy Bill updated the legislative framework in the UK to reflect government policy towards the energy market and the challenges faced on climate change and security of supply.  Key elements of the bill addressed nuclear, carbon capture and storage, renewables, and offshore gas and oil.  A framework to encourage investment in nuclear power within a new regulatory environment was simultaneously published in the January 2008 nuclear white paper.

In October 2008, the government created the Department of Energy and Climate Change to bring together energy policy (previously with the Department for Business, Enterprise and Regulatory Reform), and climate change mitigation policy (previously with the Department for Environment, Food and Rural Affairs).

Scotland
Though energy policy is an area reserved to the UK government under the Scotland Act 1998 that established devolved government for Scotland, the Scottish Government has an energy policy for Scotland at variance with UK policy, and has planning powers to enable it to put some aspects of its policy priorities into effect.

Energy markets 
A Research and Markets review estimated the 2006 total market value of UK inland energy consumption was £130.73bn. Consumption by the energy sector was valued at £28.73bn, while the value of consumption by the non-energy sector was £128.2bn, with transport being the largest component of the non-energy sector.
The UK is currently proposing wide-ranging reforms of its electricity market, including measures such as contracts for difference for generators and a capacity market to ensure security of supply in the latter half of this decade.

Primary energy sources of electricity supply

Historically a country emphasising its nuclear and off-shore natural gas production, the United Kingdom is currently in transition to become a net energy importer.

In 2011 the percentage of electricity supply derived from primary energy sources was as follows:

Natural gas: 41%
Coal: 29%
Nuclear: 18%
Renewables: 12%
Other: 2%.

Coal
In November 2015, it was announced by the UK Government that all coal fired power stations would be closed by 2025.

Ironbridge ceased operations in late 2015. Then in 2016, three power stations closed at Rugeley, Ferrybridge and Longannet. Eggborough closed in 2018 and has been granted consent to convert into a gas fired power station. Lynemouth power station was converted to run on biomass in 2018 and Uskmouth is being converted. It has been announced that Cottam will close in 2019 and Kilroot will also close imminently.

In May 2016, for the first time solar power produced more electricity than coal, producing 1.33TWh over the month compared to 0.9TWh from coal. On 21 April 2017, for the first time since the 19th century, the UK had a 24-hour period without any generation from coal power. As of 2018, the use of coal power is decreasing to historic lows not seen since before the Industrial Revolution. Coal supplied 5.4% of UK electricity in 2018, down from 7% in 2017, 9% in 2016, 23% in 2015 and 30% in 2014.

Gas
During the 1980s and early 1990s, there was a massive expansion in gas-fired generation capacity, known as the Dash for Gas.  The rapidity of construction of gas-fired plants (compared to coal-fired or nuclear plants) was especially attractive due to the high interest rates of the period.

Natural gas looks set to take a smaller part in providing future UK energy needs. Domestic production from the North Sea gas fields continues to lessen. And despite investment to enhance pipelines and storage of imported natural gas (mostly from Norway) there is a reluctance to allow too great a reliance on Russia and its gas exports for energy needs.

By 2021, North Sea oil and natural gas production is predicted to slip 75 percent from 2005 levels to less than one million barrels per year. Oil and coal reserves for all of Europe are among the most tenuous in the developed world: for example, Europe's reserves to annual consumption ratio stands at 3.0, perilously low by world standards.

A new "dash for gas" was announced by energy secretary Amber Rudd in November 2015. This is required to fill the gap between the closure of all coal-fired power stations by 2025 and the delayed opening of new nuclear power stations.

Nuclear power

Following the UK Government's January 2008 decision to support the building of new nuclear power stations, EDF announced that it plans to open four new plants in the UK by 2017. It is unlikely that more nuclear power stations will be built in Scotland as the Scottish Government is opposed.

Renewable energy

From the mid-1990s renewable energy began to contribute to the electricity generated in the United Kingdom, adding to a small hydroelectricity generating capacity. Renewable energy sources provided for 6.7 per cent of the electricity generated in the United Kingdom in 2009, rising to 11.3% in 2012.

By mid-2011, the installed capacity of wind power in the United Kingdom was over 5.7 gigawatts and the UK was ranked as the world's eighth largest producer of wind power. Wind power is expected to continue growing in the UK for the foreseeable future, RenewableUK estimates that more than 2 GW of capacity will be deployed per year for the next five years. Within the UK, wind power is the second largest source of renewable energy after biomass.

From 2020 an expansion of grid scale battery storage has been underway, helping to cope with the variability in wind and solar power. As of May 2021, 1.3 GW of grid storage batteries was active, along with the traditional pumped storage at Dinorwig, Cruachan and Ffestiniog.

Energy end usage
See main article Energy use and conservation in the United Kingdom
For 2005, the break down of UK energy usage by sector was approximately:
Transport: 35%
Space heating: 26%
Industrial: 10%
Water heating: 8%
Lighting/small electrics: 6%
There is a steady increase of fuel usage driven by an increasingly affluent and mobile population, so that fuel use increased by ten percent in the decade ending 2000.  This trend is expected to be mitigated by increased percentage of more efficient diesel and hybrid vehicles.

United Kingdom space and hot water heating consume a greater share of end use compared to the US and more mild southern European or tropical climates.  With regard to building and planning issues affecting energy use, the UK has developed guidance documents to promote energy conservation through local councils, especially as set forth in Part L of the Building Regulations (Conservation of Fuel and power).  The associated document. Part 2B, addresses commercial uses, and is generally complete as to heating issues; the guidance is lacking on lighting issues, except with guidelines for local switching of lighting controls.  In particular there are no standards set forth for illumination levels, and over-illumination is one of the most significant unneeded costs of commercial energy use.

From June 2007, buildings in England and Wales have to undergo Energy Performance Certification (EPC) before they are sold or let, to meet the requirements of the European Energy Performance of Buildings Directive (Directive 2002/91/EC).

Energy market policy history

1980s market liberalisation
Under the Conservatives during the 1980s and 1990s, government policy was one of market liberalisation linked to the privatisation of state-controlled energy companies and the dismantling of the Department of Energy.

As a consequence, government no longer has the ability to directly control the energy markets. Regulation is now carried out through the Office of Gas and Electricity Markets (Ofgem) in Great Britain, and the Northern Ireland Authority for Utility Regulation (NIAUR), while energy policy is largely limited to influencing the operation of the market. Such influence is exerted through taxation (such as North Sea Oil Tax), subsidy (such as the Renewables Obligation), incentives, planning controls, the underwriting of liabilities (such as those carried by the Nuclear Decommissioning Authority), grants, and funding for research.

1990s to 2000s
The UK Government continued to make reforms throughout the 1990s in the interests of creating a competitive energy market. VAT was first applied to domestic energy in 1994.

When the Labour Government came to power in 1997, the commitment to creating a competitive energy market was maintained, with new Energy Minister John Battle MP also emphasising the government's social obligation to protect the poorest households and its environmental commitments.

The Labour Government introduced Winter Fuel Payments for people aged over 60 and, in its first major piece of energy legislation, passed the Utilities Act 2000. This legislation implemented a licensing system for energy suppliers and created the Gas and Electricity Market Authority and Ofgem as a regulator, and the Gas and Electricity Consumer Council (known as Energywatch) as a statutory body with responsibility for protecting and promoting the interests of gas and electricity consumers in Great Britain.

In 1999, the process of full liberalisation of the gas and electricity markets had been completed when all UK households were able to switch their gas or electricity supplier. Households were encouraged to save money on their gas and electricity bills by switching between different energy providers, with about a third of gas and electricity customers switching between 1998 and 2003. By the mid-2000s, the market was dominated by what became known as the Big Six energy suppliers, consisting of British Gas, EDF Energy, E.ON, Npower, Scottish Power, and SSE.

Parliament also passed the Warm Homes and Energy Conservation Act 2000, a private member's bill introduced by Conservative MP David Amess, which set out the government's Fuel Poverty Strategy – defining "fuel poverty" as any household living on a lower income in a home which cannot be kept warm at reasonable cost – with a commitment to eliminate fuel poverty by 2016.

In 2008, Ofgem launched its Energy Supply Probe as its first major investigation of competition in the electricity and gas markets since the full liberalisation of the two markets. The probe found there were a range of features in these markets that weakened competition, but found no evidence of a cartel or that retail energy price rises could not be justified by wholesale costs.

2010 to 2017: Energy Act
In the run-up to the 2010 election, the Labour Government passed the Energy Act 2010. Among other reforms, this introduced the Warm Home Discount scheme, which came into effect in 2011, and which placed a legal obligation on larger energy suppliers to deliver support to people living in fuel poverty or in a fuel poverty risk group. This replaced a number of other schemes giving reduced tariffs to some low-income customers.

Partly in response to increasing concerns about the pricing of energy tariffs by suppliers, Ofgem followed up its Energy Supply Probe with a Retail Market Review, which it launched in November 2010. The review found that complexity in the gas and electricity markets was a barrier to consumers and competition. It found that 75% of consumers were on their supplier's standard "evergreen" tariffs (also called "Standard Variable Tariffs" or SVTs), the more expensive default option than fixed-term tariffs that would save them money over a set period of time. It also found that energy prices tended to rise in response to wholesale cost increases more quickly than they fell with decreases, and that competition was weakened by significant barriers that were preventing new suppliers from entering the market. They proposed a series of measures including changing some license conditions of suppliers, to make pricing more transparent and reduce barriers for new suppliers to compete for customers, as well as working to improve consumer trust in price comparison websites.

The Coalition Government elected in 2010 published their own white paper on energy in 2011, which focused on decarbonisation and security of supply, but which backed Ofgem's findings and proposed reforms. Advocates for further reform included the consumer group Which? and Consumer Focus (later Consumer Futures), the statutory body formerly known as Energywatch.

The government later announced its intention to force energy suppliers to offer their cheapest tariffs to consumers, and subsequently made amendments in the Energy Act 2013 to give Ofgem greater powers. In 2014, the government amended the legislative Fuel Poverty Strategy for England to target improving as many fuel poor homes as is reasonably practicable to a minimum energy efficiency rating of Band C, by the end of 2030.

On 24 September 2013, the Leader of the Labour Party and former Secretary of State for Energy, Ed Miliband, announced plans to freeze energy bills for 20 months if Labour won the next general election, saying the move would save average households £120 and businesses £1,800. The announcement was criticised by energy suppliers, and labelled "Marxist" and potentially "catastrophic" by the government, but was supported by around two-thirds of the British public.

By the end of the year, the government acknowledged that there was largescale dissatisfaction among the British public about the perception that the large energy suppliers were overcharging their customers.

After working with the Office of Fair Trading and the newly established Competition and Markets Authority (CMA), to again assess competition in the energy market, on 26 June 2014, Ofgem referred the energy market in Great Britain to the CMA for an investigation. An interim report by the CMA, published in 2015, claimed that energy suppliers were overcharging customers by as much as £1.7 billion. The CMA's findings and proposed remedies, published in 2016, included a price cap for energy customers who were on prepayment meters – but were widely criticised for not going far enough.

By March 2017, Citizens Advice, which had taken on the funding and responsibilities of Consumer Futures to advocate for energy consumers, was calling for the government to extend the prepayment meter cap to more low-income households.

2018 to present: Default tariff energy price cap

In the run-up to the 2017 general election, Prime Minister Theresa May made a commitment that the Conservative Party manifesto would include a policy to apply price controls to energy bills. May wrote in The Sun newspaper, saying that "the energy market is not working for ordinary working families" and that if she was re-elected she would introduce a price cap policy that would save households up to £100 each.

There was pressure from other members of her Cabinet to change the policy after the election result forced May to form a minority government, but also pressure from other MPs to go ahead including an open letter signed by 192 MPs, over 70 of whom were Conservative MPs. The Prime Minister reiterated her commitment to her flagship energy policy in a speech at the Conservative Party Conference in October 2017. It was announced that the price cap, or "safeguard tariff", would be implemented by Ofgem and would cap prices for electricity and gas for the 11 million households on standard variable tariffs.

The Domestic Gas and Electricity (Tariff Cap) Bill 2018 was introduced in legislation and had its first reading on 26 February 2018, following a period of pre-legislative scrutiny from the cross-party Business, Energy and Industrial Strategy Select Committee. The legislation completed its passage through Parliament on 18 July 2018 and received royal assent the next day.

The Tariff Cap Act stipulated that the price cap would be in place from the end of 2018 until 2020, when Ofgem would recommend whether the cap should remain on an annual basis up to 2023. Ofgem would also review the level of the cap at least every 6 months while it is in place.

In September 2018, Ofgem proposed that the initial level of the "default tariff price cap" would mean that energy suppliers would not be allowed to charge more than £1,136 a year for a typical dual fuel customer paying by direct debit, and that this would save the 11 million British households on default or standard variable tariffs an average of £75 a year on their gas and electricity bills.

The price of the cap is set for each unit (kWh) of gas and electricity used, plus a daily standing charge, so that it varies with consumption. Ofgem designed the cap level to take into account several factors: wholesale energy costs (how much a supplier has to pay to get the gas and electricity to supply households with energy), energy network costs (the regional costs of building, maintaining and operating the pipes and wires that carry energy across the country), policy costs (the costs related to government social and environmental schemes to save energy, reduce emissions and encourage take-up of renewable energy), operating costs (the costs incurred by suppliers to deliver billing and metering services, including smart metering), payment method uplift allowance (the additional costs incurred through billing customers with different payment methods), headroom allowance (allowing suppliers to manage uncertainty in their costs), the return on suppliers’ investments, and VAT (5% tax added to the level of the tariff).

In November 2018, Ofgem finished its consultation and published its decision that the first level of the cap would be set at £1,137 a year for a typical direct debit dual fuel bill in November 2018. This came into force from 1 January 2019. At its initial level, the cost of electricity for those on default tariffs was capped at 17p per kWh, and gas was capped at 4p per kWh. Dual fuel users would pay no more than £177 a year for the standing charge, electricity-only users would pay no more than £83, and gas users £94.

The first change in the level of the price cap was announced in February 2019, with the cap rising by £117 for typical direct debit dual fuel bills from 1 April 2019. In October 2020, the government extended the energy price cap by a year, until at least the end of 2021.

In the 2020s, several consumer-facing suppliers went into liquidation including Bulb Energy, Avro Energy, Green Supplier and Orbit Energy.

In August 2022, Ofgem announced that the price cap would be reviewed every three months instead of every six months, in reaction to wholesale price volatility. Thus the review in October 2022 would be followed by another in January 2023.

The average price cap has been set as follows:

2022-23: Government support for households 

In response to the marked increase in the default tariff cap from April 2022, on 3 February the Chancellor, Rishi Sunak, announced measures to support domestic gas and electricity customers in England, Wales and Scotland. There would be a £200 discount on energy bills, to be given in the autumn and paid back by customers in later years. In addition, from April a non-repayable £150 council tax rebate was given to households in England in tax bands A to D (estimated to be 80% of homes), and local councils received £144million to provide discretionary funding to other residents. The devolved administrations received around £715million so they could provide comparable support, and there was an expansion of the Warm Homes Discount scheme.

With further price rises expected in October, Sunak announced a further package on 26 May. The bills discount was doubled to £400 and changed to a non-repayable grant, instead of a loan; other "cost of living" support included a £650 payment to households on means-tested benefits, £300 to pensioner households and £150 to individuals receiving disability benefits. The £400 discount would be paid to domestic electricity customers in England, Scotland and Wales as six monthly rebates (or vouchers for non-smart prepayment meters) of £66 or £67, from October 2022 to March 2023 inclusive.

Following her appointment as Prime Minister on 6 September 2022, Liz Truss announced on 8 September 2022 that a new "Energy Price Guarantee" effective from 1 October 2022 to 30 September 2024 would pay a subsidy to energy and gas suppliers, in order to limit typical household energy costs to £2,500 per year. Comparable support would be offered to businesses, public sector organisations (under a six-month scheme running to 31 March 2023) and to households who do not pay directly for electricity or mains gas, such as those in park homes or on heat networks. The cost of this package of support was uncertain since it depended on future wholesale prices, but was estimated at over £100bn per year by the Institute for Fiscal Studies. On 17 October, cost-saving measures indicated by incoming chancellor Jeremy Hunt included limiting universal assistance to six months, ending on 1 April 2023, with support beyond then to be determined by a Treasury-led review. On 17 November 2022, Hunt announced in his autumn statement that the subsidy would be reduced from April 2023, increasing the costs for a typical household to £3,000 per year, but in his March 2023 budget the chancellor reversed this decision and kept the subsidy at the £2,500 level until the end of June.

Energy supply and decarbonisation policy history

Early 2000s: climate change rises up the agenda
In 2005, the Chancellor Gordon Brown commissioned Nicholas Stern to look into the economics of climate change. The influential Stern Report concluded that climate change was the "greatest and widest-ranging market failure ever seen".

Joining over 170 other nations, the UK committed to reduction of carbon dioxide emissions, with consequent constraints to its energy policy.  The UK produced four percent of the world's greenhouse gases as of 2003, compared to 23 percent by the US and 20 percent for the rest of Europe.  The long-term reduction goal for carbon emissions is 80 percent decrease by 2050.  A scheme of trading for carbon emission credits has been developed in Europe that will allow some of the reduction to arise from economic transactions.

Road transport emissions reduction has been stimulated since 1999 by the banding of Vehicle Excise Duty.  Bands for new vehicles are based on the results of a laboratory test, designed to calculate the theoretical potential emissions of the vehicle in grammes of CO2 per kilometre travelled, under ideal conditions.

Aviation fuel is not regulated under the Kyoto Protocol, so that if the UK is successful in carbon emission reduction, aviation will constitute 25 percent of UK generated greenhouse gases by 2030.

The UK government has one project in the planning stage for natural gas fed power generation with carbon capture by seawater.  This facility is contemplated at Peterhead, Scotland, a relatively remote exposure to the North Sea.

Prof Kevin Anderson raised concern about the growing effect of air transport on the climate in a paper
and a presentation
in 2008. Anderson holds a chair in Energy and Climate Change at the School of Mechanical, Aerospace and Civil Engineering at the University of Manchester in the UK.
Anderson claims that even at a reduced annual rate of increase in UK passenger air travel and with the government's targeted emissions reductions in other energy use sectors, by 2030 aviation would be causing 70% of the UK's allowable CO2 emissions.

Energy white paper, 2003
The UK Government published its white paper on energy ("Our Energy Future – creating a Low Carbon Economy") in 2003, establishing a formal energy policy for the UK for the first time in 20 years.  Essentially, the white paper recognised that a limitation of carbon dioxide ( – the main gas contributing to global climate change) was going to be necessary.  It committed the UK to working towards a 60% reduction in carbon dioxide emissions by 2050, and identified business opportunities in so doing: a recurrent theme throughout the document was "cleaner, smarter energy".  It also claimed to be based on four pillars: the environment, energy reliability, affordable energy for the poorest and competitive markets.

The White Paper focused more on analysing the issues than in providing detailed policy responses.  Some detail began to filter through in a series of follow-on documents, including an Energy Efficiency Implementation Plan (April 2004) and the DTI Microgeneration Strategy "Our Energy Challenge" (March 2006).  Nonetheless, most of the policies were a continuation of business as usual, with emphasis on market-led solutions and an expectation that consumers act rationally, for example in installing energy efficiency measures to make running cost savings.

In November 2005 it was announced that the government, under DTI leadership, would undertake a full-scale energy review, and over 500 organisations and individuals made detailed submissions as part of this review.  Officially, the review was to take stock of the outcomes to date of the white paper, which a particular focus on cutting carbon (emissions of which remained stubbornly high) and to look in more detail at security of supply, as the UK's oil and gas production from the North Sea had peaked, and Russia was seen as being a high-risk supplier of gas.

Unofficially, it was widely felt that the real reason behind the review was to allow nuclear power back into the energy debate, as it had been sidelined in the 2003 white paper. That document had said "This white paper does not contain specific proposals for building new nuclear power stations. However, we do not rule out the possibility that at some point in the future new nuclear build might be necessary if we are to meet our carbon targets. Before any decision to proceed with the building of new nuclear power stations, there will need to be the fullest public consultation and the publication of a further white paper setting out our proposals."  The energy review was therefore to be this public consultation.

Energy Review, 2006
In the light of a fast changing world energy context, increasing dependence on oil and gas imports, concerns about carbon emissions, and a need to accelerate investment in electricity infrastructure and power stations the UK Government undertook the 2006 Energy Review.  One aspect of the 2006 Review dealt with development of nuclear power.  Greenpeace challenged the government's process of consultation on proposals to develop nuclear power and following a judicial review requested by Greenpeace, on 15 February 2007 the consultation process was ruled 'seriously flawed', and 'not merely inadequate but also misleading'. As a result, plans to build a new generation of nuclear power plants were delayed while the UK Government reran the consultation process in a way that complied with the court's decision. See Nuclear power in the United Kingdom for details.

Contents
The Energy Review Report 2006 came out as a broader and more balanced document than critics (in advance) had expected.  It started by reiterating the government's four long-term goals for energy policy:

To put the UK on a path to cut carbon dioxide emissions by some 60% by about 2050, with real progress by 2020;
To maintain reliable energy supplies;
To promote competitive markets in the UK and beyond, helping to raise the rate of sustainable economic growth and to improve productivity; and
To ensure that every home is adequately and affordably heated.

It then identified two major long-term energy challenges:

Tackling climate change, along with other nations, as global carbon emissions from human activity continue to grow; and
Delivering secure, clean energy at affordable prices, as we become increasingly dependent on imports for our energy needs.

The Review took an internationalist response, stressing that the world's economies need to get on a path to being significantly less carbon-intensive, and noting rising global demand, especially from countries such as India and China. This means using less energy in products and services and changing the way energy is produced so that more of it comes from low-carbon sources.  It also identified the need for a fairer distribution of energy around the world, and identified that many resources, especially of fossil fuels which are concentrated in just a few countries.

It placed its main concerns and proposals into three groups:

Saving Energy

The starting point for reducing carbon emissions is to save energy. The challenge is to secure the heat, light and energy we need in homes and businesses in a way that cuts the amount of oil, gas and
electricity used and the carbon dioxide emitted.  Actions proposed include:

Increasing information, e.g. through Home Information Packs
Raising basic standards, removing inefficient goods from the market
Making best use of the EU Emissions Trading Scheme and Climate Change Levy
Making the government estate carbon neutral by 2012
Increasing the focus on energy efficient transport

Cleaner Energy

Cost-effective ways of using less energy will help move towards the carbon reduction goal. But on their own they will not provide the solution to the challenges faced: there is also a need to make the energy used cleaner.  Under this head, the government considered:

more distributed energy generation including low-carbon heat
more use of community based systems, including CHP
a strong commitment to carbon pricing in the UK, through improving the operation of the EU Emissions Trading Scheme
a strengthened commitment to the Renewables Obligation
proposals for reform of the planning regime for electricity projects
a clear statement of our position on new nuclear build
support for carbon capture and storage
developing alternative fuels for transport

The Energy Security Challenge

The challenges of reducing carbon emissions and ensuring security of supply are closely linked. Security of supply requires that we have good access to available fuel supplies, the infrastructure in place to transport them to centres of demand and effective markets so that supply meets demand in the most efficient way. Many of the measures already described for tackling carbon emissions also contribute to the healthy diversity of energy sources that is necessary for meeting the energy security challenge.

There are two main security of supply challenges for the UK:

Managing increased dependence on oil and gas imports, especially in the light of the global distribution of energy reserves and growing international demand; and
Ensuring that the market delivers substantial and timely investment in electricity generating capacity and networks so that households and businesses have the electricity they need at affordable prices.

The government's response is to continue to open up markets and to work internationally to develop strong relationships with suppliers, developing liberalised markets.

So where does nuclear power fit within this debate?  Although it is mentioned a lot more in the Review compared to the White Paper (441 times, compared to 55 to be exact), the government does not propose building new stations itself.  Instead, it will leave it to the market, although it will ease some of the planning constraints (which it also aims to do for renewables) and look into providing a design authorisation procedure.  As with many other aspects of the Energy Review Response, the document is not likely to be the last word on the subject, as there are plans for further consultation, and the establishment of further reviews and studies in issues such as identifying suitable sites, and managing the costs of decommissioning and long term waste management.

Energy white paper, 2007

The 2007 energy white paper: Meeting the Energy Challenge was published on 23 May 2007. The 2007 white paper outlines the government's international and domestic strategy for responding to two main  challenges:
cutting carbon emissions to tackle global warming
ensuring secure, clean and affordable energy as imports replace declining production from North Sea oil and gas
It seeks to do this in a way that is consistent with its four energy policy goals:
cutting the UK's carbon dioxide emissions by some 60% by about 2050, with real progress by 2020;
maintaining the reliability of energy supplies;
promoting competitive markets in the UK and beyond, helping to raise the rate of sustainable economic growth and to improve productivity; and
ensuring that every home is adequately and affordably heated.

The paper anticipates that it will be necessary to install 30–35 GW of new electricity generation capacity within 20 years to plug the energy gap resulting from increased demand and the expected closure of existing power plants. It also states that, based on existing policies, renewable energy is likely to contribute around 5% of the UK's consumption by 2020, rather than the 20% target mentioned in the 2006 Energy Review.

Proposed energy strategy

In summary, the government's proposed strategy involves six components:
Establishing an international framework to tackle climate change, including the stabilisation of atmospheric greenhouse gas concentrations and a stronger European Union Emissions Trading Scheme
Providing legally binding carbon targets for the whole UK economy, reducing emissions through the implementation of the Climate Change Bill.
Making further progress in achieving fully competitive and transparent international markets, including further liberalisation of the European Union energy market.
Encouraging more energy saving through better information, incentives and regulation
Providing more support for low carbon technologies, including increased international and domestic public-private sector collaboration in the areas of research, development, demonstration and deployment – for example though the launch of the Energy Technologies Institute and the Environmental Transformation Fund.

To achieve the government's aims, the white paper proposes a number of practical measures, including:

Energy conservation

Businesses:
A new mandatory cap and trade scheme for organisations consuming more than 6,000 MWh of electricity per year, to be known as the Carbon Reduction Commitment.
The introduction of Energy Performance Certificates for business premises and Display Energy Certificates for public sector organisations.
The extension of smart metering to most business premises within 5 years.
Homes:
A requirement for all new homes to be zero-carbon buildings as soon as practically possible and preferably by 2016.
Improving the energy efficiency of existing homes.
Improving the efficiency of consumer electronics and domestic appliances, and the possible phase-out of inefficient light bulbs by around 2011.
Increasing the Carbon Emission Reduction Target for the electricity and gas industries for 2008–2011.
A requirement that new domestic electricity meters should have real time displays from 2008, and a commitment to upgrade existing domestic meters on request.
Transport:
The introduction of a Low Carbon Transport Innovation Strategy
Support for including aviation within the EU Emissions Trading Scheme

Energy supply
The introduction of a Biomass Strategy to expand the use of biomass as an energy source.
Measures to grow distributed electricity generation and distributed heat generation alongside the centralised system.
A reconfirmation that, under the Renewables Obligation, renewable energy should supply 10% of electricity generation by 2010, an 'aspiration' to achieve 20% by 2020, together with the introduction of bands within the Obligation to support different renewable technologies.
The launch in November 2007 of a competition to demonstrate commercial-scale carbon capture and storage technology
A 'preliminary view is that it is in the public interest to give the private sector the option of investing in new nuclear power stations'. A consultation on this was launched at the same time as the White Paper.
The introduction of the Renewable Transport Fuel Obligation in 2008–2009, with a commitment that biofuels should provide 5% of transport fuel by 2010–2011.
Measures to support the recovery of the remaining oil and gas reserves from the North Sea.
Removing barriers to developing new energy infrastructure and power plants through reform of planning permission processes, as detailed in the 2007 Planning White Paper: Planning for a Sustainable Future.

Response of the Scottish Government

The Scottish Government responded to the UK government paper by making clear that it was against new nuclear power stations being built in Scotland and had the power to prevent any being built.  In a statement to the Scottish Parliament, Energy Minister Jim Mather stated "Members will be aware that Greenpeace, backed by the courts, have forced the UK Government to consult properly on the future role of nuclear power. We will respond and we will make clear that we do not want and do not need new nuclear power in Scotland. If an application were to be submitted for a new nuclear power station that will be for Scottish Ministers to determine. We would be obliged to look at it – but given our policy position, our generating capacity, our multiplicity of energy sources and our strong alternative strategies such an application would be unlikely to find favour with this administration."

Climate Change Act, 2008

On 13 March 2007, a draft Climate Change Bill was published following cross-party pressure over several years, led by environmental groups. The Act puts in place a framework to achieve a mandatory 80% cut in the UK's carbon emissions by 2050 (compared to 1990 levels), with an intermediate target of between 26% and 32% by 2020. The Bill was passed into law in November 2008. With its passing the United Kingdom became the first country in the world to set such a long-range and significant carbon reduction target into law, or to create such a legally binding framework.

The Committee on Climate Change, whose powers are invested by Part 2 of the Act, was formally launched in December 2008 with Lord Adair Turner as its chair.

In April 2009 the Government set a requirement for a 34% cut in emissions by 2020, in line with the recommendations of the Committee on Climate Change, and announced that details of how this would be achieved would be published in the summer.

UK Low Carbon Transition Plan, 2009
Published on 15 July 2009, the UK Low Carbon Transition Plan details the actions to be taken to cut carbon emissions by 34% by 2020, based on 1990 levels (of which 21% had been achieved at the time of publication). As a result, by 2020 is it envisaged that:

 Over 1.2 million people will be employed in green jobs.
 The efficiency of 7 million homes will have been upgraded, with over 1.5 million of them generating renewable energy.
 40% of electricity will be generated from low carbon sources (renewables, nuclear power and clean coal).
 Gas imports will be 50% lower than would otherwise have been the case.
 The average new car will emit 40% less carbon compared to 2009 levels.

Energy Bill, 2012–2013 

The Energy Bill 2012–2013 aims to close a number of coal power stations over the next two decades, to reduce dependence on fossil fuels and has financial incentives to reduce energy demand. The construction of a new generation of nuclear power stations will be facilitated, helped by the establishment of a new Office for Nuclear Regulation. Government climate change targets are to produce 30% of electricity from renewable sources by 2020, to cut greenhouse gas emissions by 50% on 1990 levels by 2025 and by 80% on 1990 levels by 2050.

Select Committee report, 2016 

The Energy and Climate Change Select Committee reported on 15October 2016 on upcoming challenges for energy and climate policy. The committee recommended investment in energy storage on the supply side and in efficiency technologies that smooth out demand peaks, by switching devices off and on and running them at lower power during times of stress, for example.

Salix Finance Ltd.
Salix Finance Ltd. provides government funding to the public sector to improve energy efficiency, reduce carbon emissions and lower energy bills. Salix is a non-departmental public body, owned wholly by the government, and funded by the Department for Business, Energy and Industrial Strategy, the Department for Education, the Welsh Government and the Scottish Government.

Energy white paper 2020 
The energy white paper 2020 has set within it a target to achieve net zero within the UK by 2050 in efforts to halter progress of Climate Change.

The UK government aim to do this by:

 Investing heavily in renewable energy sources with a goal set of 40GW (about 60% of the UK's energy consumption) of offshore wind by 2030. 
 Getting a large-scale nuclear project to the investment stages.
 Grow the rate at which electric heat pumps are installed.
 Support the deployment of CCUS
 Establishing a new UK emissions system
 Debating whether to end connections to the gas grid for new homes.

Implementing policy: government oversight 
Government supervision of the coal, gas and electricity industries was established in the 19th century. Since then, specific departments of state and regulatory bodies have had responsibility for policy implementation, regulation and control.

History 
The supply of energy in the nineteenth century – in the form of coal, gas and electricity – was largely by private companies and municipal gas and electricity undertakings. Public control of these supplies was generally in the hands of local authorities. Such control was exercised through limiting prices and dividends and by encouraging competition. State intervention was through legislation such as the Mines and Collieries Act 1842, and the Gasworks Clauses Act 1847 which restricted company dividends to ten per cent. The Electric Lighting Act 1882 established control over electricity supply industry from its earliest days. It required undertakings to obtain a license or order from the Board of Trade to generate and supply electricity. The Board of Trade and the Home Office therefore provided early oversight and control of the energy industries.

New government bodies 
Between 1919 and 1941 the newly created Ministry of Transport assumed control of the electricity industry. Under wartime conditions the Ministry of Fuel and Power was established in 1942 to coordinate energy supplies. UK Government policy was enacted through a succession of ministries and departments. These are summarised in the following table.

Other statutory bodies 
In addition to the above ministries and departments a number of regulatory bodies have been established to regulate and supervise specific aspects of energy policy and operation. These include:

 HM Inspectorate of Mines (1842–date),
 Electricity Commissioners (1919–48) to secure regional coordination,
 Central Electricity Board (1926–48) to control supplies and construct own and operate the national grid,
 National Coal Board (1947–87), owned and managed coal mining industry,
 British Electricity Authority (1948–55) to own and operate electricity generation and transmission,
 Gas Council (1948–1973), to  provide supervisory and advisory function on policy,
 Central Electricity Authority (1955–57) to own and operate electricity generation and transmission outside Scotland,
 Electricity Council (1958–1990), provide supervisory and advisory function on policy,
 Office of Electricity Regulation (Offer) (1990–2000), economic regulator independent of government,
 Office of Gas Supply (Ofgas) (1986–2000), economic regulator independent of government,
 Office of Gas and Electricity Markets (Ofgem) (2000– date), to protect the interests of consumers, where possible by promoting competition,
 Gas and Electricity Markets Authority (GEMA) (2000– date),
 Offshore Regulator for Environment and Decommissioning (OPRED),
 Oil and Gas Authority (2015–date), to regulate, influence and promote the UK oil and gas industry to maximise the economic recovery of resources.

Fossil energy public support 
David Cameron announced subsidies for the North Sea oil and gas industry in March 2014 resulting in the production of 3-4bn more barrels of oil "than would otherwise have been produced".

Renewable energy targets

The first targets for renewable energy, 5% of by the end of 2003 and 10% by 2010 'subject to the cost to consumers being acceptable' were set by Helen Liddell in 2000.

The UK Government's goal for renewable energy production is to produce 20% of electricity in the UK by 2020. The 2002 Energy Review set a target of 10% to be in place by 2010/2011. The target was increased to 15% by 2015 and most recently the 2006 Energy Review further set a target of 20% by 2020.

Subsequently, the Low Carbon Transition Plan of 2009 made clear that by 2020 the UK would need to produce 30% of its electricity, 12% of its heat and 10% of its fuels from renewable sources.

For Scotland, the Scottish Government has a target of generating 100% of electricity from renewables by 2020.  Renewables located in Scotland count towards both the Scottish target and to the overall target for the UK.

Although renewable energy sources have not played a major role in the UK historically, there is potential for significant use of tidal power and wind energy (both on-shore and off-shore) as recognised by formal UK policies, including the Energy White Paper and directives to councils in the form of PPS 22. The Renewables Obligation acts as the central mechanism for support of renewable sources of electricity in the UK, and should provide subsidies approaching one billion pounds sterling per annum by 2010. A number of other grants and smaller support mechanisms aim to support less established renewables. In addition, renewables have been exempted from the Climate Change Levy that affects all other energy sources.

The amount of renewable generation added in 2004 was 250 megawatts and 500 megawatts in 2005.  There is also a program established for micro-generation (less than 50 KWe (kilowatt electrical) or 45 KWt (kilowatt thermal) from a low carbon source) as well as a solar voltaic program.  By comparison both Germany and Japan have photovoltaic (solar cell) programmes much larger than the installed base in the UK. Hydroelectric energy is not a viable option for most of the UK due to terrain and lack of force of rivers.

Biofuels

The government has established a goal of five percent of the total transport fuel that must be from renewable sources (e.g. ethanol, biofuel) by 2010 under the Renewable Transport Fuel Obligation.  This goal may be ambitious, without the necessary infrastructure and paucity of research on appropriate UK crops, but import from France might be a realistic option.

In 2005 British Sugar announced that it will build the UK's first ethanol biofuel production facility, using British grown sugar beet as the feed stock. The plant in Norfolk will produce 55,000 metric tonnes of ethanol annually when it is completed in the first quarter of 2007. It has been argued that even using all the UK's set-aside land to grow biofuel crops would provide less than seven per cent of the UK's present transport fuel usage.

Fuel poverty

Reducing occurrence of fuel poverty (defined as households paying over ten percent of income for heating costs) is one of the four basic goals of UK energy policy.  In the prior decade substantial progress has been made on this goal, but primarily due to government subsidies to low-income families rather than through fundamental change of home design or improved energy pricing.  The following national programs have been specifically instrumental in such progress: Winter Fuel Payment, Child Tax Credit and Pension Credit.  Some benefits have resulted from the Warm Front Scheme in England, the Central Heating Programme in Scotland and the Home Energy Efficiency Scheme in Wales.  These latter programs provide economic incentives for physical improvement in insulation, etc.

Public opinion
The UK is largely supportive of renewable energy and this is primarily driven by concerns about climate change and dependence on fossil fuels.

In July 2013, the UK Energy Research Centre published a national survey of public attitudes towards energy in the UK.
74% of participants were very or fairly concerned about climate change.
82% were worried about the UK becoming too dependent upon energy from other countries.
79% wanted to see a reduction in the use of fossil fuels over the next few decades.
81% expressed a desire to reduce their energy use.
85% supported solar energy.
75% supported wind energy.
42% had never heard of carbon capture and storage (CCS) and when given further information many expressed concern, viewing it as a "non transition" – a continuation of unsustainable practices associated with fossil fuels.
The public was undecided on the role of nuclear power in the future energy mix. Over half (54%) said they would oppose the building of a new nuclear power station in their area.
A majority (53%) were willing to use electric vehicles, rising to 75% if they performed as well as conventional models.

This can be compared with a similar study from the 1st Annual World Environment Review, published in June 2007, which revealed that:
81% are concerned about climate change.
79% think their government should do more to tackle global warming.
73% think that the UK is too dependent on fossil fuels.
77% think that the UK is too reliant on foreign oil.
87% think that a minimum 25% of electricity should be generated from renewable energy sources.
24% think that the Government should do more to expand nuclear power.
56% are concerned about nuclear power.
76% are concerned about carbon dioxide emissions from developing countries.
61% think it appropriate for developed countries to demand restrictions on carbon dioxide emissions from developing countries.

Oil and gas 
Oil and gas production peaked in 1999, but in 2023 licensed more oil and gas exploration was licensed.

Analysis and criticism 

A 2016 paper argues that current UK energy policy is a contradictory mix of free market policies and government interventions, with an undue emphasis on electricity.  It concludes that the government needs to develop a clearer strategy if it is to address the three goals of economic effectiveness, environmental protection, and energy security.

See also

 UK only
 United Kingdom National Renewable Energy Action Plan, 2009
 Climate change in the United Kingdom
 Energy efficiency in British housing
 Energy switching services in the UK
 List of renewable resources produced and traded by the United Kingdom
 Merton Rule
 Timeline of the UK electricity supply industry
 UK Energy Research Centre

 UK and beyond
 Avoiding dangerous climate change
 Energy policy of the European Union
 Energy policy of the United States
 Energy Saving Trust
 Financial incentives for photovoltaics
 Low Carbon Building Programme
 National Energy Action (NEA)
 The Carbon Trust

References

External links
United Kingdom 2004 Energy Act
Text of the Climate Change and Sustainable Energy Bill
Government business efficiency portal
2006 Government Energy Review
2003 Government Energy White Paper: Our Energy Future – Creating a Low Carbon Economy
2003 Green Party Alternative Energy Review
2002 Government Energy Review
International Energy Agency UK energy statistics
UK Government Energy Statistics
Critique of Government biofuels policy
Planning Policy Statement 22 (PPS22) on renewable energy
Electricity calculator for 2020
Analysis of Renewables Growth to 2020

In the media
 23 May 2007, BBC, Britain's energy strategy
 6 September 2006, New Builder, Extra Funding For Scottish Renewables
 25 July 2006, epolitix.com, House of Lords committee reject European Commission bid for role in energy policy
 29 June 2006, BBC, Government promises carbon cuts
5 June 2006, epolitix.com, Alistair Darling: Electricity profits should be linked to efficiency
 26 September 2005, BBC, UK needs yearly climate updates

 
United Kingdom
Energy in the United Kingdom
Climate change policy in the United Kingdom
Public policy in the United Kingdom